Athletics was contested at the 1994 Asian Games in Hiroshima Big Arch, Hiroshima, Japan from October 9 to October 16.

The original winner of the women's 400 metres hurdles, Han Qing of China, was disqualified for doping – the first Asian Games athletics winner to be disqualified in such a manner.

Medalists

Men

Women

Medal table

References

Results
Asian Games Results. GBR Athletics. Retrieved on 2014-10-04.
Women's relay medallists. Incheon2014. Retrieved on 2014-10-04.
Men's relay medallists. Incheon2014. Retrieved on 2014-10-04.

 
Athletics
1994
Asian Games
International athletics competitions hosted by Japan